The Canadian Warplane Heritage Museum is an aviation museum located at the John C. Munro Hamilton International Airport in Mount Hope, Ontario, Canada. The museum has 47 military jets and propeller-driven aircraft on display.

Displayed is a collection of Canadian military aircraft, many in flying condition. The museum is also restoring several Second World War and Cold War aircraft, including a TBM Avenger a De Havilland Canada built S-2 Tracker and a Bristol Bolingbroke. The flying collection performs at air shows and is made available for local flights by museum visitors.

The Avro Lancaster flown by the museum is one of only two airworthy Lancasters in the world. Known as the Mynarski Memorial Lancaster in honour of Pilot Officer Andrew Charles Mynarski, it is painted in the markings of his aircraft.

History
After pooling their money to purchase a Fairey Firefly, Dennis Bradley, Peter Matthews, Alan Ness, and John Weir moved the aircraft into Hangar 4 at Hamilton Airport in 1972. A few years later, the museum purchased a second hangar, Hangar 3, as well. The collection was expanded with the acquisition of additional aircraft – including a B-25 in 1975 and a Lancaster in 1977. However, that same year Alan Ness was killed in the crash of a Fairey Firefly at the Canadian International Air Show.

On February 15, 1993, a fire destroyed most of Hangar #3. Destroyed in the fire were also the Hawker Hurricane, General Motors TBM Avenger, Auster, Stinson 105 and Supermarine Spitfire. A new, purpose built hangar was completed in 1996 to replace it.

In August and September 2014, the Mynarski Memorial Lancaster Bomber flew across the North Atlantic to RAF Coningsby to participate in six weeks of airshows and events across the United Kingdom. Unique to this tour, the Lancaster VeRA (as it became known due to its wartime VR-A markings) flew in close formation with the Royal Air Force – Battle of Britain Memorial Flight's Lancaster bomber PA474 for most of the 60 displays and events over the two months of the tour. Lancaster VeRA returned to Hamilton on September 29, 2014.

Collection 

As of February 2023, Transport Canada and the museum lists the following aircraft in its database and operate as ICAO airline designator CWH, and telephony WARPLANE HERITAGE.

 Auster AOP.6 16681
 Avro Anson V 12417
 Avro Lancaster X FM213
 Avro Canada CF-100 Canuck Mk.5D 18785
 Beechcraft CT-134 Musketeer 134222
 Beechcraft D18S A-0156
Beechcraft V35
 Boeing Stearman PT-17 Kaydet 41-8621
 Canadair CF-5A Freedom Fighter 116757
 Canadair CF-104D Starfighter 12641
 Canadair CF-104 Starfighter 12790
 Canadair CT-114 Tutor 26038
 Canadair CT-133 Silver Star 21275
 Canadair Sabre Mk.6 23651
 Canadian Vickers Canso 11084
 Cessna L-19 Bird Dog 21085
 Cessna Crane I 7862
 de Havilland DHC-1B Chipmunk 18035
 de Havilland DH.82C Tiger Moth 8922,
 de Havilland DH.82C Tiger Moth 4947
 de Havilland Vampire FB.6 J-1145
 de Havilland Canada CSF-2 Tracker 1577
 de Havilland Canada DHC-5 Buffalo 811
 Douglas Dakota III FZ692
 Douglas DC-3 2141
 Fairchild Bolingbroke IVT 10117
 Fairchild Cornell II 10694
 Fairchild Cornell II FV702
 Fairey Firefly VI WH632
 Fleet 21K FAL-11
 Fleet 16B
 Fleet 60K Fort 3540
 Fleet 60K Fort 3643
 Fleet 80 Canuck
 Fleet Finch II 4738
 Fouga CM.170 Magister (Aerospatiale)
 Hawker Hurricane II – Replica
 General Motors TBM-3E Avenger 53858
 McDonnell CF-101B Voodoo 101045
 Nanchang CJ-6A 47-22
 Noorduyn Norseman V N29-47
 North American B-25J Mitchell 45-8883
 North American Harvard IV 20213
 North American Harvard IV 20412
 North American Yale 3350
 North American Yale 3400
 Piper PA-22
 Stinson 10A
 Supermarine Spitfire XVI TE214
 Westland Lysander IIIA 2363

Images

Affiliations 

The museum is affiliated with: CMA,  CHIN, OMMC and Virtual Museum of Canada.

See also 

List of aerospace museums
 List of attractions in Hamilton, Ontario
 List of Canadian organizations with royal patronage
 Organization of Military Museums of Canada
 Military history of Canada

References

External links 

 Canadian Warplane Heritage Museum
Photos of aircraft at the Canadian Warplane Heritage Museum

Aviation history of Canada
Aerospace museums in Ontario
Military and war museums in Canada
Museums in Hamilton, Ontario
Organizations based in Canada with royal patronage
Aircraft preservation